The 1991 National Soccer League First Division was the sixth edition of the NSL First Division in South Africa. It was won by Mamelodi Sundowns.

Table

References

NSL First Division seasons